Garvin Nedd (born 21 July 1972) is a Guyanese cricketer. He played in fourteen first-class matches for Guyana from 1994 to 2000.

See also
 List of Guyanese representative cricketers

References

External links
 

1972 births
Living people
Guyanese cricketers
Guyana cricketers
Sportspeople from Georgetown, Guyana